Ancistrus aguaboensis is a species of catfish in the family Loricariidae. It is native to South America, where it is known from the upper Tocantins River basin. The area in which the species occurs is characterized by riffles and a primarily rocky substrate, although some amounts of gravel and sand are present. The species reaches 6.7 cm (2.6 inches) SL. It sometimes appears in the aquarium trade, where it is usually either known as the Aguaboa ancistrus, the Aguaboa pleco, or by its L-number, L032.

References 

aguaboensis
Fish described in 2001
Fish of South America